King Grayskull is a fictional character first introduced in the 2002 animated series He-Man and the Masters of the Universe. In 2021, the character was introduced in the Masters of the Universe: Revelation animated series which has no connection to the 2002 series and serves as a continuation of the He-Man and the Masters of the Universe animated series from the 1980s.

He-Man and the Masters of the Universe (2002) 
In the 2002 remake of He-Man and the Masters of the Universe, it is revealed that Castle Grayskull was once home to King Grayskull, an ancestor of Prince Adam and Princess Adora. 
He appears in the episode, "The Power of Grayskull", waging battle and ultimately defeating the Snake Men led by King Hiss. However, Grayskull lost his sword in battle. He hoped it to be a sign that it signified true peace for Eternia. However, Hiss' rival Hordak, who had defeated the Snake Men, was planning on conquering Eternia. Therefore, Grayskull went on a quest to find the power he needed to defend his kingdom. At the top of a mountain, he met the oracle who guided him on his quest, showing him his lost sword and explaining that his entire quest was to show his inner strength. Before leaving however, the Oracle informed him that he would not survive the battle. Despite knowing this, King Grayskull vowed to do whatever it took to save Eternia. He then returned to face Hordak. Though outnumbered, Grayskull managed to channel his mystical energies through his sword, turning Hordak's spell on himself and his army, sending them to the dark dimension called Despondos. Despite this victory however, the Oracle's prophecy came to pass, for Hordak, whose spirit/soul was ripped from his body, managed to mortally wound Grayskull. As he lay dying, he proclaimed that his successor will wield his sword to defend Eternia. During his lifetime, King Grayskull ruled with wisdom and compassion.

King Grayskull's character design was originally an early prototype for He-Man himself. 

Although Grayskull eventually fell before Hordak's magic, he was able to preserve his powers inside the sword, so that one day his descendants could reclaim the power and call upon Grayskull's name whenever evil threatens the peace of Eternia. Grayskull's spirit remains hidden away deep inside the castle bears his name.

Masters of the Universe: Revelation (2021) 
In the 2021 Masters of the Universe: Revelation, King Grayskull was the first champion of Eternia and the namesake of Castle Grayskull. He is encountered in Eternia's heaven-like afterlife, Preternia; he provides guidance and support that allows the main characters to return to Eternia.  His character design closely resembles his 2002 appearance, save that he is Black, a change made in part to make him more visually distinct from He-Man.

References

Television characters introduced in 2003
Fictional kings
Fictional swordfighters
Masters of the Universe Heroic Warriors
Male characters in animated series